The following events occurred in February 1953:

February 1, 1953 (Sunday)
The surge of the North Sea flood continues from the previous day:
The Groenendijk, a section of the Schielands Hoge Zeedijk (Schielands High Seadyke) in the Netherlands begins to collapse. A river ship de Twee Gebroeders, commanded by Captain Arie Evegroen, is successfully used to plug the hole in the dyke.  
A S-class submarine, is swamped by floods while in drydock at Sheerness Dockyard in the UK. It sinks but is later raised and repaired.
Two British police officers, Inspector Charles Lewis and Constable Leonard Deptford of the Lincolnshire Constabulary, carry out heroic rescue operations when the sea wall is breached. Both later receive the George Medal. 
JOAK-TV begins broadcasting from Tokyo, the first television station in Japan.
The 1953 NASCAR Grand National Series in the United States begins with a race at Palm Beach Speedway, won by Lee Petty.
 Died: Archibald Nicoll, 66, New Zealand artist

February 2, 1953 (Monday)
A Skyways Limited Avro York, carrying 39 people from Lajes Field in the Azores to Gander, Newfoundland, disappears over the North Atlantic Ocean and its fate is never discovered.
Died: Alan Curtis, 43, American actor, of heart failure

February 3, 1953 (Tuesday)
Batepá massacre: Hundreds of São Tomé's native creoles, known as forros, are killed by the colonial administration and Portuguese landowners when a rebellion is anticipated.

February 4, 1953 (Wednesday)
Born: Kitarō, Japanese musician composer, record producer and arranger, in Toyohashi

February 5, 1953 (Thursday)
Walt Disney's feature film Peter Pan is released in US cinemas, initially as a double feature with the True-Life Adventures documentary short, Bear Country.
Sweet rationing ends in the UK.
Died: Iuliu Maniu, Romanian politician (b. 1873)

February 6, 1953 (Friday)
English contralto Kathleen Ferrier, terminally ill with cancer, is taken from Covent Garden Opera House in London on a stretcher after forcing herself to complete the second night of her run in Gluck's Orfeo ed Euridice.

February 7, 1953 (Saturday)
A Douglas C-54A-5-DC Skymaster operated by Union Aéromaritime de Transport crashes into trees on its approach to Bordeaux–Mérignac Airport in Bordeaux, France; nine of the 21 people on board are killed.

February 8, 1953 (Sunday)
The 1953 World Figure Skating Championships open in Davos, Switzerland.
Born: Mary Steenburgen, American actress, in Newport, Arkansas

February 9, 1953 (Monday)
A Curtiss C-46D Commando of the Egyptian Air Force, carrying 35 people, crashes in the desert east of Cairo, killing all but five of the occupants.
In Scotland, the Fraserburgh life-boat John and Charles Kennedy capsizes while on its way to escort fishing vessels into harbour during a storm. Six crew members are killed.
Died: Cecil Hepworth, English director (b. 1874)

February 10, 1953 (Tuesday)
A Fairchild C-119C-18-FA Flying Boxcar of the United States Air Force crashes on approach to Bitburg Air Base, West Germany, during a snowstorm, killing all five occupants.

February 11, 1953 (Wednesday)
US President Dwight D. Eisenhower refuses a clemency appeal for spies Julius and Ethel Rosenberg.
The Soviet Union breaks diplomatic relations with Israel after a bomb explosion at the Soviet embassy in reaction to the "Doctors' plot".

February 12, 1953 (Thursday)
The 1953 Torud earthquake, with an intensity of 6.6, kills at least 800 people in the Great Salt Kavir area of Torud, Semnan, Iran. 
The Nordic Council is inaugurated.
Died: Hal Colebatch, 80, Australian politician, briefly Premier of Western Australia

February 13, 1953 (Friday)
The Central Unitaria de Traballadores(CUT) is created, bringing together the majority of the Chile's trade unions.
Christine Jorgenson, one of the first American transsexuals to undergo successful sexual reassignment surgery in Denmark, returns home to New York.

February 14, 1953 (Saturday)
In Australia, two state elections take place, following recent boundary changes. In New South Wales, the result is a landslide victory for the Labor Party, led by Joseph Cahill. Labor also wins in Western Australia, under Albert Hawke.
A partial solar eclipse occurs.

February 15, 1953 (Sunday)
Comodoro Rivadavia rail disaster: 36 people are killed and 65 injured when an overloaded railbus is derailed on a sharp bend at Punta Piedras, near Comodoro Rivadavia in the Patagonian province of Chubut, Argentina.
In the Paraguayan general election, incumbent president candidate Federico Chávez was re-elected unopposed, the Colorado Party being the only party permitted by the country's laws.
In the Liechtenstein general election, the Progressive Citizens' Party wins eight of the 15 seats in the Landtag and remains in coalition with the Patriotic Union.
The devalued South Korean Won is replaced by a new currency, the Hwan.

February 16, 1953 (Monday)
The Pakistan Academy of Sciences is established in Lahore, during the fifth Pakistan Science Conference.

February 17, 1953 (Tuesday)
Edward Short, MP, complains to the Secretary of State for War, James Hutchison, in the UK Parliament about the failure to provide individual headstones for Chelsea Pensioners in Brookwood Cemetery, saying "Is it not a shocking disgrace that these fine old Pensioners should have their graves marked only by a peg in the ground with a number attached to it?" Following a campaign, the graves are placed in the care of the Commonwealth War Graves Commission.

February 18, 1953 (Wednesday)
The KOLN (Channel 10) TV station begins broadcasting on Channel 12 in Lincoln, Nebraska, United States.

February 19, 1953 (Thursday)
The US state of Georgia introduces a book censorship board.
Born: Cristina Fernández de Kirchner, Argentine politician, President of Argentina 2007–2015, in Tolosa, La Plata
Died: Nobutake Kondō, Japanese admiral (b. 1886)

February 20, 1953 (Friday)
Born: Riccardo Chailly, Italian orchestral conductor, in Milan

February 21, 1953 (Saturday)
An explosion destroys the Nitroform Products Company plant in Newark, New Jersey, United States.

February 22, 1953 (Sunday)
The South American Championship football tournament begins, hosted by Peru after Paraguay drop out because of the lack of a suitable stadium.
Born: Geoffrey Perkins, British comedy producer, writer, actor (d. 2008)

February 23, 1953 (Monday)
Following elections in the Australian state of New South Wales, the new ministry, led by Joe Cahill of the Labor Party, takes power.
Died: Sir Cecil Hunter-Rodwell, British colonial administrator (b. 1874)

February 24, 1953 (Tuesday)

February 25, 1953 (Wednesday)
Jacques Tati's film Les Vacances de M. Hulot, introducing the gauche character of Monsieur Hulot, is released in France.
Born: Martin Kippenberger, German artist, in Dortmund (d. 1997) 
Died: Sergei Winogradsky, Russian scientist (b. 1856)

February 26, 1953 (Thursday)
A week before Joseph Stalin's unexpected death, US bishop Fulton J. Sheen, at the end of his weekly TV show, Life Is Worth Living, reads the assassination scene from Shakespeare's Julius Caesar, with the names of high-ranking Soviet officials replacing the main characters, concluding that "Stalin must one day meet his judgment".
A British cargo ship runs aground at Huglen, Norway.
 Born: Michael Bolton, American singer and songwriter, as Michael Bolotin, in New Haven, Connecticut.

February 27, 1953 (Friday)
 The London Agreement on German External Debts is concluded by the major parties, writing off 50% of repayable war debt owed by the Federal Republic of Germany to its creditors.
Born: Oleg Moliboga, Ukrainian/Soviet volleyball player and coach, in Dnipro, Ukrainian Soviet Socialist Republic

February 28, 1953 (Saturday)
Greece, Turkey, and Yugoslavia sign the Balkan Pact (Agreement of Friendship and Cooperation) in Ankara.
James Watson and Francis Crick of the University of Cambridge publicly claim to have discovered the structure of the DNA molecule.
Joseph Stalin holds a party at his Volynskoe dacha. The party breaks up at 4 AM the following day, March 1, 1953.

References

1953
1953-02
1953-02